Ping Li is a Professor of Psychology, Linguistics, and Information Sciences and Technology at Pennsylvania State University.  He specializes in language acquisition, focusing on bilingual language processing in East Asian languages and connectionist modeling.  Li received a B.A. in Chinese linguistics from Peking University in 1983, an M.A. in theoretical linguistics from Peking University, a Ph.D. in psycholinguistics from Leiden University and the Max Planck Institute for Psycholinguistics in 1990, and completed post-doctoral fellowships at the Center for Research in Language at the University of California, San Diego and the McDonnell-Pew Center for Research in Cognitive Neuroscience in 1992.  Li has been employed at the Chinese University of Hong Kong (1992–1996), the University of Richmond (1996–2006), and Pennsylvania State University (2008–present), and he has also served as a Visiting Associate Professor at Hong Kong University (2002–2003), an adjunct professor at the State Key Laboratory for Cognitive Neuroscience and Learning at Beijing Normal University (2000–present), as well as Program Director for the Perception, Action, and Cognition Program and the Cognitive Neuroscience Program at the National Science Foundation (2007–2009).

Li is also President-Elect of the Society for Computers in Psychology and one of the four chief editors of Bilingualism: Language and Cognition, Cambridge University Press.

Selected publications 
Li, Ping and Shirai, Yashuhiro (2000). The acquisition of lexical and grammatical aspect. Berlin: Mouton de Gruyter.
Klein, W. and Li, Peng (2009). The expression of time. Berlin: Mouton de Gruyter.
Li, Ping and Marrongelle, Karen (2013). Having Success with NSF: A Practical Guide. New York: Wiley.
Grosjean, F. and Li, Peng (2013). The psycholinguistics of bilingualism. New York: Wiley.

References

External links
Ping Li's Brain, Language, and Computation lab page at Penn State University
Ping Li's Faculty Bio at the Penn State University Department of Psychology
Ping Li's CV

Year of birth missing (living people)
Living people
Chinese psychologists
Developmental psycholinguists
Peking University alumni
Leiden University alumni
Pennsylvania State University faculty
Bilingualism and second-language acquisition researchers

American cognitive scientists